B-Sides & Rarities Volume II is a compilation album by American heavy metal band CKY. Produced by the band's guitarist Chad I Ginsburg, it was released by Distant Recordings on October 3, 2011. The album features a number of previously unreleased tracks, including demo and acoustic recordings, and acts as the successor to B-Sides & Rarities, released in March 2011. New song "3D" was released as a single.

Background
All eight tracks on B-Sides & Rarities Volume II were previously featured on the double vinyl reissue of B-Sides & Rarities, released in September 2011. "3D" was recorded for planned inclusion in the film Jackass 3D, but was ultimately omitted; it was released digitally on August 17, 2011. When the album was released on Bandcamp, it featured artwork bearing the name B-Sides & Rarities Bonus Tracks.

Track listing

Personnel
Deron Miller – vocals, guitar, bass, synthesizers
Chad I Ginsburg – guitar, bass, synthesizers, vocals, production
Jess Margera – drums

References

CKY (band) albums
2011 compilation albums
Sequel albums
B-side compilation albums